Chokhorling Gewog (Dzongkha: ཆོས་འཁོར་གླིང་) is a gewog (village block) of Pemagatshel District, Bhutan.

References

External links
 https://web.archive.org/web/20100503060847/http://www.pemagatshel.gov.bt/gewogDetail.php?id=43

Gewogs of Bhutan
Pemagatshel District